Lind (also Romanized as Līnd; also known as Lin) is a village in Valupey Rural District, in the Central District of Savadkuh County, Mazandaran Province, Iran. At the 2006 census, its population was 249, in 70 families.

References 

Populated places in Savadkuh County